Aditi Arya (born 18 September 1993) is an Indian actress, model, research analyst and beauty pageant titleholder who was crowned Femina Miss India World in 2015.  She represented India at Miss World 2015 pageant.

Early life
Arya was born in Chandigarh and studied at Sacred Heart Senior Secondary School in her early years before moving to Gurgaon where she completed her schooling at Amity International School. She then completed her graduation with a finance major in business studies from Delhi University's Shaheed Sukhdev College of Business Studies. She was enrolled in the Indian School of Business through their Young Leaders Programme while working as a research analyst for one of the big four audit firms, Ernst & Young.

She is enrolled in the Yale School of Management, MBA class of 2023.

She has been associated with several non-profit groups such as Amitasha, Supported Decision Making and Protsahan. She has also been involved in street theatre, touching topics such as civic sense and sensitivity towards specially abled.

Pageantry

Femina Miss India 2015
Aditi was crowned the winner at fbb Femina Miss India World 2015, on 28 March 2015 in Mumbai.

Miss World 2015
After winning the title of Femina Miss India World 2015 represented India at Miss World 2015, the 65th edition of the Miss World pageant. She was amongst the top 5 in Multimedia award, top 5 in People's choice award, top 10 in World Fashion Designer Dress award, top 25 in Beauty With a Purpose award, top 30 in the talent sub-competition and top 30 in the Top Model sub-competition.

Acting career
After passing on the crown of Femina Miss India 2015, Aditi Arya has made her Tollywood debut as the lead heroine in Director, Puri Jagannadh's film with Nandamuri Kalyan Ram titled Ism. The film was a box office success and was well received by audience and critics alike.

She then made her Kannada debut as Uttara in the magnum opus Kurukshetra, which is being shot in 3D.

She has played the lead role in the 36 episode Hindi web series Tantra directed by Sidhant Sachdev and produced by Vikram Bhatt. She has also done another web series Spotlight 2 with the same team, to be released on 26 January on the International over-the-top video service Viu.

She is currently shooting for her next Tollywood film Ninnu Vadili Nenu Polenule.

Filmography

References

External links
Miss India 2015 Aditi Arya Could be a Next Bollywood Super Star
 

1993 births
Living people
People from Gurgaon
Actresses from New Delhi
Female models from Delhi
Miss World 2015 delegates
Femina Miss India winners
Beauty pageant contestants from India
Indian beauty pageant winners